Jedlovnik is a dispersed settlement in the hills northwest of Zgornja Kungota in the Municipality of Kungota in the western part of the Slovene Hills in northeastern Slovenia.

References

External links 
Jedlovnik on Geopedia

Populated places in the Municipality of Kungota